Gabino Arregui (7 November 1914 – 19 May 1991) was an Argentine footballer. He played in seven matches for the Argentina national football team in 1940 and 1941. He was also part of Argentina's squad for the 1941 South American Championship.

References

External links
 

1914 births
1991 deaths
Argentine footballers
Argentina international footballers
Place of birth missing
Association football forwards
Club de Gimnasia y Esgrima La Plata footballers